Kepler-17b is a planet in the orbit of star Kepler-17, first observed by the Kepler spacecraft observatory in 2011. Kepler-17b is a gas giant nearly 2.45 times the mass of Jupiter, and is sometimes described as a "super-Jupiter".
The planet is likely to be tidally locked to the parent star. In 2015, the planetary nightside temperature was estimated to be equal to 2229 K.

The study in 2012, utilizing a Rossiter–McLaughlin effect, have determined the planetary orbit is probably aligned with the equatorial plane of the star, misalignment equal to 0°.

References

Exoplanets discovered in 2011
17b